The Sheriff of Fife was historically the office responsible for enforcing law and order in Fife, Scotland and bringing criminals to justice.

Prior to 1748 most sheriffdoms were held on a hereditary basis. From that date, following the Jacobite uprising of 1745, they were replaced by salaried sheriff-deputes, qualified advocates who were members of the Scottish Bar.

Following a merger of the sheriffdoms, the office became the Sheriff of Fife and Kinross in 1881.

In 1975 the sheriffdom was largely merged into the new sheriffdom of Tayside, Central and Fife.

Sheriffs of Fife

David de Wymess (c. 1170)
Geoffrey de Inverkunglas (1213)
John Hay of Naughton (1227-1228)
Inghram de Balfour (1229)
John Hay of Naughton (1233-1234)
David de Wymess (1239)
Ingram de Balliol (1240)
David de Lochore (1264)
Alexander Synton (1281)
Hugh de Lochore (1289)
Constantine de Lochore (1290)
John de Valognes (1292)
Hugh de Lochore (1293)
David Barclay (1295)
John de Valognes (1296)
Duncan Balfour (-1298)
John Balfour (1300)
Constantine de Lochore (1304-1305)
Richard Siward (1305)
David Barclay (1306)
Michael Balfour (1314-1315)
David Barclay (1328)
Patrick de Polwarth (1332)
John Balfour (1344)
David de Wymess (1358-1360)
William Disshington (1370)
David de Barclay (1372)
Alan Erskine (1388)
George Leslie (1396)
John Lumsden of Glengirnock (1424)
Henry of Wardlaw - 1439 - Deputy
Robert Livingston of Drumry (1449)
Andrew Lundy (1452)
Andrew Sibbald (1456)
Alexander Kennedy (1464)
Andrew Lundy (1452)
John Balfour (1475)
Andrew Lundin of Balgonie (1497-1512)
George Leslie, Earl of Rothes (1529-1540)
John Murray, 2nd Earl of Atholl (1660)

Sheriffs-Depute
1748–1761: Hon James Leslie of Mildeans 
1761–1780: James Dalgliesh of Scotscraig  
1780–1799: Claud Irvine Boswell of Balmuto
1799–>1802: Neil Fergusson of Pitculle 
1807–1811: David Monypenny, Lord Pitmilly 
1811–:John Anstruther 
c.1822–1838: Andrew Clephane
1838–1861: Alexander Earle Monteith
1861–1870: Donald Mackenzie 
1870–1881: James Arthur Crichton

Sheriffs of Kinross
John de Kinross (1264)
John de Kinross (1290)
Alan de Vipont (1328)
John de Crichton (1360)
Alan Erskine (1364)
Robert Halket (1373)

Sheriffs of Fife and Kinross (1881)
 1881–1886: James Arthur Crichton 
 1886–1901: Aeneas James George Mackay
 1901–1905: Charles Kincaid Mackenzie
 1905–1906: Robert Tannahill Younger
 1906–1909: William James Cullen, Lord Cullen KC
 1909–1910 George Lewis MacFarlane KC 
 1910–1913: Thomas Brash Morison
 1913–1926: James Alexander Fleming
 1926–1937: John Charles Fenton
1937–1941: John Rudolph Wardlaw Burnet
1941–1971: John Adam Lillie
1971–1974: Charles Eliot Jauncey
 In 1975 the sheriffdom was largely merged into the new sheriffdom of Tayside, Central and Fife.

See also
 Historical development of Scottish sheriffdoms

References

Perth and Kinross
Sheriff